Nassington railway station is a former railway station in Nassington, Northamptonshire. It was owned by the London and North Western Railway but from 1883 to 1916 was also served by trains of the Great Northern Railway.
It opened for passengers along with Wakerley and Barrowden railway station and King's Cliffe railway station on 1 November 1879, on a new section of line constructed from Wansford Line Junction at Seaton to Yarwell Junction at Wansford.

Nassington station closed to passengers on 1 July 1957, (at the same time as Wansford railway station and Castor railway station, the next two stations east towards Peterborough), and to goods on 3 August 1957. The line remained open until the withdrawal of the passenger service from Rugby (Midland) to Peterborough (East) on 6 June 1966. On that date the section from Rugby (Midland) to King's Cliffe was closed completely, but the line east of King's Cliffe station remained open for goods traffic. The last train to the quarry ran on 4 January 1971, and the siding and railway at Nassington finally closed on 26 February 1971.

References

Disused railway stations in Northamptonshire
Former London and North Western Railway stations
Railway stations in Great Britain opened in 1879
Railway stations in Great Britain closed in 1957